Glory By Honor XVI was a two night, two city professional wrestling event produced by Ring of Honor (ROH), which took place on October 12, 2018 at UMBC Event Center in Baltimore, Maryland (live event) and on October 14, 2018 at the 2300 Arena in Philadelphia, Pennsylvania (tapings for ROH's flagship program Ring of Honor Wrestling).

Storylines
Glory By Honor XVI will feature professional wrestling matches, involving different wrestlers from pre-existing scripted feuds, plots, and storylines that played out on ROH's television programs. Wrestlers portrayed villains or heroes as they followed a series of events that built tension and culminated in a wrestling match or series of matches.

Matches

Night 1 - Baltimore, MD

Night 2 - Philadelphia, PA (TV Tapings)

References

External links
https://www.rohwrestling.com/live/events/101218-glory-honor-baltimore-baltimore-md
https://www.rohwrestling.com/live/events/101418-glory-honor-philadelphia

2018 Ring of Honor pay-per-view events
2018 in Maryland
Events in Baltimore
Professional wrestling in Baltimore
Glory By Honor
October 2018 events in the United States